John A. Barry (born 10 December 1928 in New Zealand) was a tennis player. He played for New Zealand in the Davis Cup of 1947 and 1954.

References

External links

1928 births
Living people
New Zealand male tennis players